Htoe mont is a traditional Burmese dessert or mont. The dessert is a glutinous rice cake cooked with raisins, cashews and coconut shavings, and is consistently prodded during the cooking process, lending it a texture similar to Turkish delight. Htoe mont is prepared in a similar manner as other Burmese desserts including mont kalame (မုန့်ကုလားမဲ) and Pathein halawa. Htoe mont is considered a delicacy of Mandalay, and is a popular souvenir from the city.

References

Burmese cuisine
Desserts
Burmese desserts and snacks
Rice cakes